The 1982 Kentucky Wildcats football team represented the University of Kentucky in the Southeastern Conference (SEC) during the 1982 NCAA Division I-A football season.  In their first season under head coach Jerry Claiborne, the Wildcats compiled a 0–10–1 record (0–6 against SEC opponents), finished in last place in the SEC, and were outscored by their opponents, 287 to 96.  The team played its home games in Commonwealth Stadium in Lexington, Kentucky.

The team's statistical leaders included Randy Jenkins with 933 passing yards, George Adams with 720 rushing yards, and Robert Mangas with 293 receiving yards.

Jerry Claiborne had been the head football coach at Virginia Tech from 1961 to 1970 and Maryland from 1972 to 1981.  He had played college football at Kentucky under Bear Bryant from 1946 to 1949. He was hired as Kentucky's head football coach in December 1981.

Schedule

References

Kentucky
Kentucky Wildcats football seasons
Kentucky Wildcats football